is a Japanese politician and the current governor of Tokushima Prefecture in Japan, first elected in 2003. A native of Ikeda, Osaka and graduate of the University of Tokyo, he had worked at the Ministry of Home Affairs since 1984 before elected as a Governor of Tokushima Prefecture in late 2003.

References 
 

  

University of Tokyo alumni
People from Ikeda, Osaka
1960 births
Living people
Governors of Tokushima Prefecture

Politicians from Tokushima Prefecture